Sara Powell (born 23 June 1968) is a British-Jamaican stage, screen and voice-over actress and audiobook narrator. Her regular television roles include crown prosecutor Rachel Barker in the BBC's police procedural drama HolbyBlue (2007–2008), driver Sally Reid in ITV's firefighting drama London's Burning (1993–1994) and psychologist Cass in Channel 4's sitcom Damned (2016–2018).

She also played historical figure Mary Seacole in the thirteenth series of the BBC One long-running science fiction series Doctor Who (2021), as well as a number of other characters in its spin-off audio dramas, produced by Big Finish Productions.

Early life and education 
Powell was born on 23 June 1968 in Jamaica. She loved acting from a very young age, making up little shows together with her brother and forcing her father and any guests at home to watch them. She studied acting at London's Royal Central School of Speech and Drama.

Career

Television 
Powell's television debut happened in 1992, in an episode of the BAFTA-winning BBC police drama Between the Lines. From 1993 to 1994, she appeared in her first regular role in both the sixth and seventh series of the ITV firefighting drama London's Burning, playing Sally Reid, the watch's first female driver. In 2007, she joined the main cast of the BBC police procedural drama HolbyBlue (2007–2008), playing senior crown prosecutor Rachel Barker throughout the first and second series.

From 2016 to 2018, Powell appeared as psychologist Cass in both series of the Channel 4 sitcom Damned (2016–2018), starring comedians Jo Brand, Alan Davies and Kevin Eldon. Her other television highlights include the ITV crime dramas The Ice Cream Girls (2013), Little Boy Blue (2017) and Unforgotten (2018), comedy thriller You, Me and the Apocalypse (2015), medical drama The Family Man (2006), situation comedy Ghosts (2021) and the film My Zinc Bed (2008), starring Uma Thurman.

In 2021, she played historical figure Mary Seacole in the episode "War of the Sontarans" of the BBC's long-running science fiction series Doctor Who, featuring the Thirteenth Doctor, played by Jodie Whittaker. Fans of the classic Doctor Who series, broadcast from 1963 to 1989, may also be familiar with Powell's voice, as she has portrayed more than ten other characters in several Doctor Who audio drama spin-offs from Big Finish Productions, featuring the First, Fourth, Sixth and Seventh Doctors.

Stage work 
Since 1995, she has appeared on stage as often as on television, taking part in about thirty productions at the National Theatre, Bristol Old Vic, Bush Theatre, Donmar Warehouse, Arcola Theatre, Crucible Theatre, Birmingham Rep and more. Powell played various Shakespearean roles, such as Andromache in Troilus and Cressida (1999), Lady Macduff in Macbeth (2005) and Queen Elizabeth in Richard III (2017). Her other classical credits include playing Cariola in John Webster's revenge tragedy The Duchess of Malfi (2000–2001) for the Royal Shakespeare Company's touring production, directed by Gale Edwards. In 2005, Powell starred opposite Friends star David Schwimmer in Neil LaBute's original West End production of Some Girl(s) at the Gielgud Theatre. The cast also included Catherine Tate, Lesley Manville and Saffron Burrows.

In April 2003, she made her debut as a theatre director with Come Out Eli, a play based on the events of the Hackney siege, Britain's longest police siege. It opened at the Tristan Bates Theatre in London only four months after the siege ended. The story was told through recounting interviews taken from eyewitnesses and local residents during the incident. Powell dismissed accusations that the production was exploiting a tragedy, "This [is] not exploitative to me because we are re-telling people's stories. We are not using the stories in any way because we are telling them in the way they told us during the interviews. It is a different method of storytelling to your usual theatre experience. It is technically quite difficult but it does capture the nuances of tone and speech in a very real way."

In 2019, she got a small part in the romantic comedy film Last Christmas, written by Emma Thompson and starring Game of Thrones actress Emilia Clarke. Three years later, she joined Clarke in her West End debut, Anton Chekhov's The Seagull, directed by Jamie Lloyd. It was broadcast in cinemas worldwide as part of the National Theatre Live programme, just like Powell's other theatrical production, The Madness of George III (2018), with Mark Gatiss as the lead. Two more plays starring Powell, Mapping the Edge (2001) and Albert Camus's The Plague (2017), have been broadcast on BBC Radio.

Filmography

Film

Television

Audio

Full-cast audio dramas

Audiobook narration 
 The Cellar (2015) by Minette Walters
 When I Was Invisible (2016) by Dorothy Koomson 
 All Men Want to Know (2020) by Nina Bouraoui, translated by Aneesa Abbas Higgins
 Bernard and the Cloth Monkey (2021) by Judith Bryan
 The Sex Lives of African Women (2021) by Nana Darkoa Sekyiamah
 Citizens: A Chronicle of the French Revolution (2021) by Simon Schama
 Assassin's Orbit (2021) by John Appel
 Sankofa (2021) by Chibundu Onuzo
 Island Songs (2021) by Alex Wheatle
 What Is History, Now? (2021) by Helen Carr and Suzannah Lipscomb
 In Every Mirror She's Black (2021) by Lola Akinmade Åkerström
 Evelyn Dove: Britain's Black Cabaret Queen (2022) by Stephen Bourne
 The Wordhord (2022) by Hana Videen
 Blood to Poison (2022) by Mary Watson
 The Blunder (2022) by Mutt-Lon, translated by Amy B. Reid
 The Racial Code: Tales of Resistance and Survival (2022) by Nicola Rollock

Video games 
 The Secret World (2012)
 Dragon Age: Inquisition (2014)
 Dragon Age: Inquisition – Trespasser (2015)
 Red Solstice 2: Survivors (2021)
 Dying Light 2: Stay Human (2022)

Theatre

References

External links 

 
 Sara Powell at British Comedy Guide

Living people
1968 births
British actresses
Alumni of the Royal Central School of Speech and Drama
British television actresses
British stage actresses
British film actresses
Audiobook narrators
British video game actresses
British voice actresses
Jamaican actresses
21st-century British actresses
British theatre directors